Julius Julskötare ("Julius Christmas Handler") or Kalenderhuset ("The Calendar House") was the Sveriges Television's Christmas calendar in 1978. When aired at TV1 in 1978, it had no official name, other than that of Christmas calendar.

Plot 
The main character, played by Björn Skifs, guides the viewers taking a look at some fictional companies.

Video 
On 23 October 2013, the series was released to DVD.

References

External links 
 

1978 Swedish television series debuts
1978 Swedish television series endings
Sveriges Television's Christmas calendar
Television shows set in Sweden